Greatly Blessed is an album from Contemporary Christian, Southern Gospel group Gaither Vocal Band. The album was released on August 10, 2010.

Track listing

"Better Day" (Connie Harrington, Steven Jones) - 3:54
"When He Blest My Soul" (J.R. Baxter, Cleavant Derricks) - 3:11
"Love Like I'm Leavin'" (Lowell Alexander, Benjamin Gaither, Jeff Silvey) - 3:36
"You Are My All in All" (Dennis Jernigan) - 5:14
"Please Forgive Me" (Gerald Crabb) - 3:58
"Greatly Blessed, Highly Favored" (William J. Gaither, Larry Gatlin) - 2:57
"He Is Here" (Kirk Talley) - 6:38
"Ain't Nobody" (Benjamin Gaither, Jeff Silvey) - 3:35
"Clean" (William J. Gaither, Larry Gatlin) - 4:29
"Muddy Water" (Roger Brown, Benjamin Gaither, Jeff Silvey) - 3:55
"I Know How to Say Thank You" (Barry Jennings, Suzanne Jennings) - 4:34
"That Sounds Like Home To Me" (Eddie Crook, Charles Aaron Wilburn) - 4:52
"He's Alive" (Don Francisco) - 5:11

Band members

David Phelps - First Tenor
Wes Hampton - Second Tenor
Michael English - Lead
Mark Lowry - Baritone
Bill Gaither - Bass

Awards

At the 42nd GMA Dove Awards, Greatly Blessed won two Dove Awards: Southern Gospel Album of the Year and Southern Gospel Recorded Song of the Year for the song "Better Day". The group was also nominated for Group of the Year.

Chart performance

The album peaked at #53 on Billboard 200 and #2 on Billboard's Christian Albums, where it spent 23 weeks.

References

External links
Greatly Blessed on Amazon

2010 albums
Gaither Vocal Band albums